Bert Freed (November 3, 1919 – August 2, 1994) was an American character actor, voice-over actor, and the first actor to portray Detective Columbo.

Life and career
Born and raised in the Bronx, New York, Freed began acting while attending Penn State University, and made his Broadway debut in 1942. Following World War II Army service in the European theatre, he appeared in the Broadway musical The Day Before Spring in 1945 and dozens of television shows between 1947 and 1985. His film debut occurred, oddly enough, in a musical Carnegie Hall (1947).

Freed portrayed Rufe Ryker in the television series Shane, in which Freed added a unique touch of realism by beginning the show clean-shaven and growing a beard from one week to the next, never shaving again through the season. 

Freed played homicide detective Lt. Columbo in a live 1960 television episode of The Chevy Mystery Show seven years before Peter Falk played the role, and also before Thomas Mitchell portrayed the eccentric police detective on stage prior to the Falk version.

Freed made four guest appearances on Perry Mason, including the role of Ken Woodman in the 1960 episode, "The Case of the Treacherous Toupee"; murder victim Joe Marshall in the 1964 episode, "The Case of the Ruinous Road"; and Carl Holman, whose wife is the murderer in the 1962 episode "The Case of the Poison Pen-Pal."

He appeared (sometimes more than once) in many other television shows such as The Rifleman, Laramie, Bonanza, The High Chaparral, Gunsmoke, The Big Valley, The Virginian, Mannix, Barnaby Jones, Charlie's Angels,  Then Came Bronson, Run For Your Life,  Get Smart, The Lucy Show, Hogan's Heroes, Voyage to the Bottom of the Sea, Dr. Kildare, Ben Casey, Combat!, Petticoat Junction, The Outer Limits,  Alfred Hitchcock Presents, Route 66, Ironside, The Green Hornet, The Munsters, The Untouchables, and many others. He directed one episode of T.H.E. Cat.

Freed appeared as a racist club owner in No Way Out (1950), Private Slattery in Halls of Montezuma (1951), the Police Chief in Invaders From Mars (1953), Sgt. Boulanger in Paths of Glory (1957), the hangman in Hang 'Em High (1968), Max's father in Wild in the Streets (1968), as Chief of Detectives in Madigan (1968), a homosexual prison guard in There Was a Crooked Man... (1970) and Bernard's father in Billy Jack (1971) in which he got "whumped" on the side of the face by Billy Jack's right foot "just for the hell of it."

Later years and death
He retired from acting in 1986, and died of a heart attack in Sechelt, British Columbia, in 1994 while on a fishing trip with his son.

Selected filmography

 Boomerang (1947) as Herron, Man in Alley Mob (uncredited)
 Carnegie Hall (1947) as Moving Man (uncredited)
 Twelve O'Clock High (1949) as Officer Standing at Bar (uncredited)
 Key to the City (1950) as Emmy's Husband
 Black Hand (1950) as Prosecutor
 Ma and Pa Kettle Go to Town (1950) as Dutch, 3rd New York Henchman
 Where the Sidewalk Ends (1950) as Det. Paul Klein
 711 Ocean Drive (1950) as Steve Marshak (uncredited)
 No Way Out (1950) as Rocky Miller (uncredited)
 Halls of Montezuma (1951) as Slattery
 The Company She Keeps (1951) as Smitty
 Detective Story (1951) as Det. Dakis
 Red Mountain (1951) as Sgt. Randall
 Anything Can Happen (1952) as Immigration Officer (uncredited)
 The Atomic City (1952) as Emil Jablons
 The Snows of Kilimanjaro (1952) as American Soldier (uncredited)
 Tangier Incident (1953) as Kozad
 Invaders From Mars (1953) as Police Chief A.C. Barrows (uncredited)
 Take the High Ground! (1953) as Sgt. Vince Opperman
 The Long, Long Trailer (1953) as Foreman
 Men of the Fighting Lady (1954) as Lt. (jg) Andrew Szymanski
 The Cobweb (1955) as Abe Irwin
 The Desperate Hours (1955) as Tom Winston
 Paths of Glory (1957) as Staff Sergeant Boulanger
 The Goddess (1958) as Lester Brackman
 The Gazebo (1959) as Lt. Joe Jenkins
 Why Must I Die? (1960) as Adler
 The Chevy Mystery Show (1960) Episode "Enough Rope" as Lt Columbo
 The Subterraneans (1960) as Bartender
 What Ever Happened to Baby Jane? (1962) as Ben Golden
 Twilight of Honor (1963) as Sheriff B.L. 'Buck' Wheeler
 Shock Treatment (1964) as Frank Josephson
 Invitation to a Gunfighter (1964) as Sheriff
 Fate Is the Hunter (1964) as Dillon
 Nevada Smith (1966) as Quince
 The Swinger (1966) as Police Captain
 Sail to Glory (1967) as Horace Greeley
 Madigan (1968) as Chief of Detectives Hap Lynch
 Wild in the Streets (1968) as Max Jacob Flatow Sr.
 Hang 'Em High (1968) as Schmidt, the Hangman
 There Was a Crooked Man... (1970) as Skinner
 Billy Jack (1971) as Mr. Stuart Posner
 Evel Knievel (1971) as Doc Kincaid
 Mission Impossible (1972) as Leon Chandler /TV Episode "Committed"
 Death Scream (1975) as Detective Ross
 Love and the Midnight Auto Supply (1977) as Mayor John Randolph
 Till Death (1978) as Dr. Sawyer
 Barracuda (1978) as Papa Jack
 Norma Rae (1979) as Sam Dakin

References

External links

 
 

1919 births
1994 deaths
American male stage actors
American male film actors
American male television actors
American male voice actors
People from the Bronx
Military personnel from New York City
20th-century American male actors
United States Army personnel of World War II
United States Army soldiers
American television directors